The 1965 World Modern Pentathlon Championships were held in Leipzig, East Germany.

Medal summary

Men's events

Medal table

See also
 World Modern Pentathlon Championships

References

 Sport123

Modern pentathlon in Europe
World Modern Pentathlon Championships, 1965
World Modern Pentathlon Championships, 1965
International sports competitions hosted by East Germany
Sports competitions in Leipzig